Cambodia had a total primary energy supply (TPES) of 5.48 Mtoe in 2012. Electricity consumption was 3.06 TWh. About one third of the energy came from oil products and about two thirds from biofuels and waste.

Cambodia has significant potential for developing renewable energy. In 2020, however, the country had no set renewable energy targets. To attract more investment in renewable energy the country could adopt clear renewable energy targets, improve renewable energy governance and facilitate market entry for foreign investors.

Along with other ASEAN member states, Cambodia remains one of the most vulnerable countries to climate change in the world; therefore, it is recommended that the country focuses on developing more renewable energy as part of climate change mitigation policies.

Cambodia controls offshore oil reserves in the Gulf of Thailand; however, the only attempt to extract oil ended in the failure in 2021 of the Apsara field project after production did not meet expectations.

Cambodia's domestic energy supply in 2021 was 9,255 GWh, with 44% hydro, 41% coal, 8% fuel oil, and 6% solar.

Many rural communities are making use of solar power to access electricity. Cambodia had 305 MW of solar installed at the end of 2021, with seven grid-connected projects. Another 700 MW was planned or under construction.

See also

List of power stations in Cambodia
Electricity Authority of Cambodia
Ministry of Industry, Mining and Energy (Cambodia)
Hydropower in the Mekong River Basin
2013 Southern Vietnam and Cambodia blackout

References